Jaclyn Talia Gilday Baquero (born 12 November 2000), known as Jackie Gilday, is a Nicaraguan footballer who plays as a midfielder for American college team UCLA Bruins and the Nicaragua women's national team.

Early life and education
GIlday was born in Orlando, Florida, United States and raised in New Smyrna Beach, Florida. She has attended the Spruce Creek High School. Her father is American and her mother is of Ecuadorian and Nicaraguan descent.

College career
Gilday has attended the University of California, Los Angeles.

International career
Gilday represented Nicaragua at two CONCACAF Women's U-20 Championship editions (2018 and 2020). She made her senior debut on 17 February 2022, starting in a 1–2 away loss to Trinidad and Tobago during the 2022 CONCACAF W Championship qualification.

Honours 
UCLA Bruins
 NCAA Division I Women's Soccer Championship: 2022

References

External links

2000 births
Living people
People with acquired Nicaraguan citizenship
Nicaraguan women's footballers
Women's association football midfielders
Nicaragua women's international footballers
Nicaraguan people of American descent
Nicaraguan people of Ecuadorian descent
Sportspeople of Ecuadorian descent
Soccer players from Orlando, Florida
People from New Smyrna Beach, Florida
Sportspeople from Volusia County, Florida
Soccer players from Florida
American women's soccer players
UCLA Bruins women's soccer players
American people of Ecuadorian descent
American people of Nicaraguan descent
American sportspeople of North American descent